NBA In The Zone 2000 is a basketball video game released for the Nintendo 64, PlayStation, and Game Boy Color in 2000. It is the fifth and final installment of the NBA In The Zone series. The cover features Marcus Camby of the New York Knicks.

Gameplay
Players can play as any of the 29 NBA teams from the 1999–2000 NBA season, which feature more than 300 actual players in motion-captured animation, featuring play-by-play from NBA announcer Red Clay, and standard gameplay modes like Exhibition, Season, and Playoffs, a Slam Dunk Contest and Three-Point Shootout.

Reception

The Nintendo 64 and PlayStation versions received unfavorable reviews according to the review aggregation website GameRankings. Electronic Gaming Monthly, Game Informer, GameFan and Nintendo Power gave the game mixed reviews, months before the game was released Stateside. Rob Smolka of NextGen called the same N64 version "a travesty of a basketball game" that "manages to eke out a score of one star only because our rating system doesn't go any lower."

Notes

References

External links

2000 video games
Game Boy Color games
Konami games
Multiplayer and single-player video games
NBA In The Zone
Nintendo 64 games
PlayStation (console) games
Video games developed in Japan